Abdallah Ra'ed Mahmoud Al-Fakhouri (born January 22, 2000) is a Jordanian professional footballer who plays as a goalkeeper for Saudi Arabian club Al-Ain and the Jordan national team. As a teenager, he is already considered one of his country's most promising talents at the position.

Club career
Al-Fakhouri trialled with Belgian side Waasland-Beveren in June 2018. He had also received invitations from Real Valladolid in Spain and Sporting Lisbon in Portugal. However, the following month, he signed his first professional contract, deciding to stay at Al-Wehdat on a four-year deal. He is generally seen as the successor to Amer Shafi.

On 16 January 2023, Al-Fakhouri joined Saudi Arabian club Al-Ain.

International career
Al-Fakhouri led the national under-19 team to an appearance in the 2018 AFC U-19 Championship, finishing in first place in their qualifying group.

Before even playing with the Al-Wehdat first team, Al-Fakhouri was called up to the senior national team in late 2017 for the third round of 2019 AFC Asian Cup qualification.

He made his senior international debut on 11 January 2018, replacing Yazid Abu Layla during a friendly 1–2 defeat to Finland. At 17 years old, he became the youngest goalkeeper in Jordan's history.

Al-Fakhouri was named in Jordan's squad for the 2022 AFC U-23 Asian Cup.

International statistics

References

External links
 
 
 

Living people
2000 births
Jordanian footballers
Jordan international footballers
Association football goalkeepers
Jordanian Pro League players
Saudi First Division League players
Al-Wehdat SC players
Al-Ain FC (Saudi Arabia) players
People from Zarqa Governorate
Jordan youth international footballers
Jordanian expatriate footballers
Expatriate footballers in Saudi Arabia
Jordanian expatriate sportspeople in Saudi Arabia